This is a list of paper mills sorted by country.

Algeria 
 GIPEC SPA, Baba-Ali Mill, Bilda

Argentina 
 Papel Prensa, San Pedro Pulp and Paper Mill, San Pedro, Buenos Aires Province

Australia 
 ABC Tissue Products, Sydney
 Asaleo Care
 Box Hill Mill, Box Hill, Victoria
 Australian Paper
 Maryvale Mill, Morwell, Victoria
Shoalhaven Mill, S3, Bomaderry, New South Wales (closed July 2015)
 Orora Fibre and Packaging
 Orora Botany Mill, Botany, New South Wales
 Encore Tissue, Melbourne
 Kimberly-Clark, Millicent
 Norske Skog
 Norske Skog Albury, Albury, New South Wales (sold to Visy in 2019)
 Norske Skog Boyer, Boyer, Tasmania
 Queensland Tissue Products, Brisbane
 Visy Paper
 Visy Smithfield Mill, Smithfield, New South Wales
 Visy Coolaroo Mill, Coolaroo, Victoria
 Visy Gibson Island Mill, Gibson Island, Queensland
 Visy Reservoir Mill, Reservoir, Victoria
 Visy Tumut Mill, Tumut, New South Wales

Austria 
 Mayr-Melnhof
 Frohnleiten Mill, Frohnleiten
 Hirschwang Mill, Reichenau an der Rax
 Norske Skog Bruck
 Salzer Paper
 Smurfit Kappa Nettingsdorfer
 Wattenspapier
 Steyrermühl
 Sappi Gratkorn

Bangladesh  

 Bashundhara Paper Mills
 Karnaphuli Paper Mills, Chittagong 
  Manz-Fi Paper Mills Ltd. (Munshigonj)
Odyssey Multilink Ltd. Diakhaly, Zirabo, Ashulia.
 Hakkani Paper & Board Mills Pvt. Limited. Chattogram
 Crative Paper Mills limited ( Narayonganj)
 Meghna Pulp and Paper Mills Ltd.
 Tanveer Paper Mills Ltd.
 Alnoor Paper Mills Ltd.
 Mainuddin Paper Mills Ltd.
 Mohiuddin Paper Mills Ltd.
 Lipy Paper Mills Ltd.
 Afil Paper Mills Ltd. (Cigarettes paper)
 Asian Paper Mills Ltd 
 TK Paper and Board Mills Ltd.
 Sonali Paper Mills Ltd.
 Younus Paper Mills Ltd.
 Ananta Paper Mills Ltd.
 Astia Paper Mills Ltd.
 Base Papers Ltd.
 Haji Paper Industries Ltd.
 Capital Paper and Board Mills Ltd.
 Purbachal Paper Mills Ltd.
 Partex Paper Mills Ltd.
 Amber super and Board Mills Ltd.
 Makka Paper and Board Mills Ltd.
 Lina Paper Mills Ltd.
 Ajmatali Paper Mills Ltd.
 Raja Paper Mills Ltd.
 Kibria Paper Mills Ltd.
 Bhai bhai board Mills Ltd.
 Azad Paper Industries Ltd.
 Mohera Paper Mills Ltd.
 Ali Paper Mills Ltd.
 Hakkaki Board Mills Ltd.
 Adhunik Paper and Board Mills Ltd.
 Bangladesh Paper Mills Ltd.
 MAP Paper Mills Ltd.
 SA Paper Mills Ltd.
 Hasan Paper and Board Mills Ltd.
 Shahjalal Paper Mills Ltd.

Belgium 

 Sappi, Lanaken Paper Mill, Lanaken
 Stora Enso, Langerbrugge
 Burgo, Burgo Ardennes mill, Virton

Brazil 

 Celulose Irani, Vargem Bonita Mill, Vargem Bonita
 Fibria
 Aracruz Barra do Riacho Mill, Aracruz
 VCP Três Lagoas Pulp Mill, Três Lagoas
 Jari Celulose
 Nova Campina Mill, Nova Campina
 Paulínia Mill, Paulínia
 Suzano Mill, Suzano
 Klabin
 , Jacarei Paper Mill, Jacareí
 Suzano Papel e Celulose

Canada 

 Cascades 
404, Marie-Victorin Blvd
Kingsey Falls, Québec, Canada
J0A 1B0
 Nordic Kraft
 Lebel-sur-Quévillon Kraft Mill, Lebel-sur-Quévillon, Quebec
 Domtar
 Windsor Mill, Windsor, Quebec
 Espanola Mill, Espanola, Ontario
 Paper Excellence Group
 Howe Sound Pulp & Paper, Sunshine Coast (British Columbia), BC
 Kruger
 Bromptonville Mill, Brompton, Quebec
 Corner Brook Mill, Corner Brook
 Trois-Rivieres Mill, Trois-Rivières, Quebec
 Resolute Forest Products
 Alma Mill, Quebec
 Amos Mill, Quebec
 Clermont Mill, Quebec
 Kenogami Mill, Quebec
 Dolbeau Mill, Quebec
 Thunder Bay Mill, Ontario
Barber Paper Mill, Ontario
 WestRock, La Tuque Mill, La Tuque, Quebec

Chile 
 Celulosa Arauco y Constitución
 Arauco Pulp Mill, Arauco
 Constitución Pulp Mill, Constitución
 Licancel Pulp Mill, Licantén
 Nueva Aldea Pulp Mill, Nueva Aldea
 Valdivia Pulp Mill, San José de la Mariquina
 CMPC
 Laja Mill, Laja
 Maule Mill, Maule
 Pacifico Mill, 
 Santa Fe Mill, Nacimiento
 Valdivia Mill, Valdivia

China 

 Asia Pacific Resources International Holdings (APRIL)
 APRIL SSYMB (former Shandong Rizhao SSYMB Pulp and Paper), Shandong
 C&S Paper Chengdu, Sichuan
 C&S Paper Jiangmen, Guangdong
 Chenming Paper
 Chenzhou Yunong Paper
 Chongqing Wei Er Mei Paper, Chongqing
 Dongguan Jianhui Paper
 Dongguan Jinzhou Paper
 Fook Woo Group Huizhou, Guangdong
 Fujian Hengli, Nanan, Fujian
 Fushun Paper Co Ltd, Liaoning
 Gold East Paper, Jiangsu
 Guangxi Nanning Phoenix Pulp & Paper, Nanning, Guangxi
 Jinhai Pulp Mill, Yangpu Economic Development Zone, Hainan
 Lee & Man Paper, Chongqing
Panda Thermal Paper Roll Company 
 Sichuann Jinan Pulp & Paper, Suining, Sichuan
 Sichuan Yibin Lizhuang, Yibin, Sichuan
 Vinda International, Guangdong
 Weifang Henglian Paper Group, Weifang, Shandong
 Xiamen Xinyang Paper, Xiamen, Fujian
 Yuen Foong Yu Paper, Yangzhou, Jiangsu
 Zhejiang JingXing Paper, Pinghu, Zhejiang
 Zhenjiang Gold River Pulp & Paper
 Taizhou Forest Packing Group

Denmark 
 Bruunshaab Gamle Papfabrik
 
 
 
 
 
 
 Strandmøllen

Egypt 

 Al Zeina Tissue Mill, 10th of Ramadan City
 Mediterranean Tissue Mill, Alexandria
 Nuqul Group
Al Bardi Paper Mill, 6th of October City
Al Sindian Paper Mill, 6th of October City
 Shotmed Paper Industries

Finland 

 Ahlstrom, Kauttua Paper Mill, Eura
 BillerudKorsnäs
 Pietarsaari Paper Mill, Jakobstad
 Tervasaari Paper Mill, Tervasaari
 Georgia-Pacific, Nokia Paper Mill, Nokia
 Metsä Board
 Kyro Paper Mill, Hämeenkyrö
 Simpele Paper Mill, Rautjärvi
 Äänekoski Paper Mill, Äänekoski
 Metsä Tissue, Mänttä Paper Mill, Mänttä
 Mondi, Lohja Paper Mill, Lohja (closed 2015) 
 Sappi
 Kangas Paper Mill, Jyväskylä (closed 2010) 
 Kirkniemi Paper Mill, Lohja
 Stora Enso
 Anjala Paper Mill, Anjalankoski
 Kaukopää Paper Mill, Imatra
 Oulu Paper Mill, Oulu
 Tainionkoski Paper Mill, Imatra
 Varkaus Paper Mill, Varkaus
 Veitsiluoto Paper Mill, Kemi
 UPM-Kymmene Corporation
 Jämsänkoski Paper Mill, Jämsä
 Kaukas Paper Mill, Lappeenranta
 Kymi Paper Mill, Kouvola
 Rauma Paper Mill, Rauma
 Tervasaari Paper Mill, Valkeakoski
 Wisapaper Paper Mill, Jakobstad

France 

 DS Smith
 Chouanard Paper Mill, Coullons
 Kaysersberg Paper Mill, Kaysersberg
 Nantes Paper Mill, Nantes
 Glatfelter, Glatfelter Scaer SAS, Scaer
 M-real, Alizay Paper Mill, Alizay
 Munksjö Paper (:sv:Munksjö)
 Munksjö Arches SAS, Arches
 La Gère Paper Mill, Pont-Évêque
 Rottersac Paper Mill, Lalinde

Germany 
 DS Smith
 Aschaffenburg Paper Mill, Aschaffenburg
 Witzenhausen Paper Mill, Witzenhausen
 Heinzel,   
 Raubling Papier GmbH, Raubling
Glatfelter
 Glatfelter Dresden GmbH, Dresden
 Gernsbach
 Mayr-Melnhof
 Baiersbronn Frischfaser Karton, Baiersbronn
 Mayr-Melnhof Gernsbach, Gernsbach
 FS-Karton, Neuss
 Mercer
 Mercer Zellstoff Rosenthal, Rosenthal
 Mercer Zellstoff Stendal, Stendal
 M-real, Zanders Paper Mill, Zanders
 Munksjö Paper (:sv:Munksjö)
 Dettingen Paper Mill, Dettingen an der Erms
 Unterkochen Paper Mill, Aalen
 Norske Skog Walsum Duisburg
 Palm Paper
 Aalen
 Eltmann
 Wörth am Rhein
 Mitsubishi Paper Mills, HiTec Paper
 Bielefeld
 Flensburg
 Sappi
 Alfeld Paper Mill, Alfeld
 Ehingen Paper Mill, Ehingen
 Stockstadt Paper Mill, Stockstadt am Main

 Schoellershammer
 Stora Enso
 Eilenburg Paper Mill, Eilenburg
 Hagen Paper Mill, Hagen
 Maxau Paper Mill, Maxau
 UPM-Kymmene Corporation, Nordland Papier

Greece 
 Diana (Thrace Paper Mill), Bankrupt, Aigaleo
 Elina (Komotini Paper Mill S.A.), Aigaleo

India 

 Paswara Papers Limited
 Shree Ajit Pulp and Paper Limited
 Disha Industries Pvt Limited
 Hindustan Paper Corporation
 Hindustan Paper Corporation Ltd. Township Area Panchgram  - Cachar Paper Mill, Panchgram, Assam
 Nagaon Paper Mills, Kagaj Nagar, Jagiroad, Assam
 JK Paper Ltd.
 Ballarpur Industries
 Century Pulp & Paper, Lalkua
 Khanna Paper Mills
 Millenium Papers, Morbi
 Mysore Paper Mills
 Orient Paper Mills
 Punalur Paper Mills, Punalur
 Sirpur Paper Mills
 Tamil Nadu Newsprint and Papers Limited
 Seshasayee Paper And Boards
 The South India Paper Mills
 Trident Paper Mills
 West Coast Paper Mills, Dandeli
 Bellona Paper Mill Pvt Ltd, Morbi, Gujarat
 Asia Pacific Resources International Holdings (APRIL)
[Andhra Paper Ltd Rajahmundry]

Iran 

Security Paper Mill (TAKAB), Amol County, Mazandaran Province
Mazandaran Wood and Paper mill (Mazandaran Wood and Paper Company), Sari County, Mazandaran Province
Pars Paper Co.,producer of bagasse pulp from sugarcane, it is located in south of Iran. Bagasse pulp is used for making paper also tissue and food contact biodegradable tableware and food containers.

Israel 

 Hadera Paper Mill, Hadera, Israel

Italy 

 DS Smith, Lucca Paper Mill, Lucca
 Fedrigoni
 Arco Paper Mill, Arco, Trentino
 Varone Paper Mill, Varone
 Verona Paper Mill, Verona
 Cartiere Miliani Fabriano, Fabriano
 Fabriano Paper Mill, Fabriano
 Pioraco Paper Mill, Pioraco
 Rocchetta Paper Mill, Fabriano
 Industria Cartaria Pieretti
 Cartiera San Martino

Indonesia 
 Asia Pulp & Paper
 Indah Kiat Perawang Paper Mill

Japan 
 Chuetsu Pulp
 Daio Paper
 Hokuetsu Corporation
 Mitsubishi Paper Mills
 Nippon Paper Industry
 Oji Paper Company
 Rengo Co.
 Amagasaki Mill
 Kanazu Mill
 Tonegawa Mill
 Yashio Mill
 Yodogawa Mill
 Tokushu-Tokai Paper
 Tomoegawa Paper
 Hyogo Pulp

Jordan 

 Nuqul Group
Al-Keena Paper Mill, Amman
Al-Snobar Paper Mill, Amman

Korea 

 Hansol Paper
 Moorim Paper
 Hankuk Paper

Malaysia 

 Sabah Forest Industries, Sipitang, Sabah
 Nibong Tebal Paper Mill

Netherlands 

 DS Smith, De Hoop Paper Mill, Eerbeek
 Mayr-Melnhof, Mayr-Melnhof Eerbeek, Eerbeek
 Sappi

Maastricht Paper Mill, Maastricht
Nijmegen Paper Mill, Nijmegen, (Closed 2015)

 Schut Papier, Heelsum
Smurfit Kappa, Roermond
Coldenhove Papier, Eerbeek
Crown Van Gelder, Velsen-Noord

New Zealand 
 Norske Skog Tasman, Kawerau
 Oji Fibre Solutions
 Tasman Mill, Kawerau
 Kinleith Mill, Tokoroa
 Penrose Mill, Auckland
 Asaleo Care Tasman, Kawerau
 Whakatane Board Mill Whakatane, Whakatane
 PanPacific Forest Products, Napier
 Winstone Pulp International Karioi, Ohakune

Norway 

 Bamble Cellulosefabrikk (Closed 1978)
 Hunsfos Fabrikker, Vennesla (Closed 2011)
 Mayr-Melnhof, MMK FollaCell, Follafoss
 Nordic Paper, Greåker Paper Mill, Greåker
 Norske Skog
 Norske Skog Follum, Hønefoss (Closed 2012)
 Norske Skog Saugbrugs, Halden
 Norske Skog Skogn, Levanger
 Norske Skog Union, Skien (Closed 2006)
 Peterson, Ranheim Papirfabrikk, Ranheim
 Union (Union CO) Skotfoss Bruk, Skotfoss (Closed 1986)

Pakistan 
Bulleh Shah Packaging (Pvt) Ltd. Kasur, Punjab Pakistan

 Century Paper & Board Mills, Bhai Pheru
 Pakistan papersack division thal limited hub,karachi

https://thalpackaging.com/

Poland 

 International Paper - Kwidzyn
 Arctic Paper - Kostrzyń nad Odrą
 Polska Wytwórnia Papierów Wartościowych - Warszawa

Portugal 
 Portucel Soporcel
 Cacia Pulp and Paper Mill,
 Figueira da Foz Pulp and Paper Mill, Figueira da Foz
 Setúbal Pulp and Paper Mill, Setúbal
 Altri
 Celbi, Celulose Beira Industrial S.A, Figueira da Foz
 Caima-Indústria de Celulose S.A., Constância
 Celtejo, Empresa de Celulose do Tejo, S.A., Vila Velha de Ródão

Russia 
 Mondi, Syktyvkar Paper Mill, Syktyvkar
 ZAO International Paper (former OAO Svetogorsk), Svetogorsk
 Ilim Group (previously Kotlas Pulp and Paper Mill), Koryazhma

Slovakia 
 Mondi, Ruzomberok

Slovenia 
 Mayr-Melnhof, Kolicevo Karton, Količevo

South Africa 

 Sappi, South Africa
 Mondi, South Africa

Sri Lanka 

 Valaichchenai Paper Mill, Valaichchenai
 Embilipitiya Paper Mill, Embilipitiya

Sweden 

 Aditya Birla Group, Domsjö Fabriker, Örnsköldsvik
 Arctic Paper
 , Grycksbo
 Munkedal Paper Mill, Munkedal
 BillerudKorsnäs
 , Frövi
 , Grums
 Gävle Paper Mill, Gävle
 Karlsborg Paper Mill, Karlsborg, Kalix
 Skärblacka Paper Mill, Skärblacka
 Crane & Co., Tumba Bruk, Tumba
 , Gustavsfors
 Holmen AB
 Braviken Paper Mill, Norrköping
 , Hallstavik
 Iggesund Paperboard, Iggesund, Hudiksvall
 Lafarge, Örebro (Closed 2010)
 Lessebo Bruk AB, Lessebo
 Metsä Board, Husum Paper Mill, Husum
 Metsä Tissue
 Katrinefors Mill, Mariestad
 Nyboholm Mill, Kvillsfors
 Pauliström Mill, Pauliström
 Mondi, Dynäs Paper Mill, Dynäs
 
 Aspa Paper Mill, Aspa
 , Billingsfors
 Jönköping Paper Mill, Jönköping
 Nordic Paper
 , Bäckhammar
 Säffle Paper Mill, Säffle
 , Åmotfors
 
 Rottneros Paper Mill, Rottneros
 Vallvik Paper Mill, Vallvik
 Smurfit Kappa, Lövholmen Paper Mill, Lövholmen
 Stora Enso
 Fors Paper Mill, Fors
 , Hyltebruk
 , Kvarnsveden
 Nymölla Paper Mill, Nymölla
 , Skoghall
 , Skutskär
 Svanskogs Bruk, Svanskog
 SCA
 Edet Paper Mill, Edet
 Munksund Paper Mill, Munksund
 Obbola Paper Mill, Obbola
 SCA tissue, Jönköping
 , Timrå
 , Sundsvall
 Svenska Pappersbruket, Klippan Paper Mill, Klippans bruk
 , Kisa Paper Mill, Kisa
 Södra 
 , Mönsterås
 , Mörrum
 , Väröbacka
 Waggeryd Cell, Waggeryd Paper Mill, Vaggeryd

Switzerland 
 Sappi, Biberist Paper Mill, Biberist (Closed 2011)

Taiwan 
 Yuen Foong Yu Paper, Taipei
 Chang Kung Mill, Wu Zu
 Chiu Tang Mill, Ta Shu Hsiang
 Hsin Wu Mill, Hsin Wu
 Taitung Paper Mill, Taitung
 Yangmei Mill, Taoyuan City

Trinidad & Tobago
Grand Bay Paper Products/Trinidad Tissues Limited,

Thailand

United Kingdom 

 BillerudKorsnäs, Beetham Paper Mill, Beetham, Cumbria 
 Bridgewater Paper Co, Ellesmere Port (Closed 2010)
 DS Smith
 Kemsley Paper Mill, Kemsley
 Wansbrough Paper Mill, Watchet
 Frogmore Paper Mill, Hemel Hempstead, Hertfordshire
 Glatfelter, Glatfelter Lydney Ltd, Lydney, England
 Higher Kings Mill, Cullompton
 Holmen AB, Workington Mill, Workington
 Palm Paper, King's Lynn Mill, King's Lynn
 UPM-Kymmene Corporation, UPM Shotton Paper Mill, Shotton, North Wales
Smurfit Kappa, Townsend Hook, Snodland.

United States 
* Cascades
Head Offices
404, Marie-Victorin Blvd
Kingsey Falls, Québec, Canada
J0A 1B0
 Allied Paper Corporation, Kalamazoo, Michigan
 Clearwater Paper, Spokane, Washington
 Arkansas Paperboard Mill, Arkansas City, Arkansas
 Lewiston Paper Mill, Lewiston, Idaho
 Warren Paper Mill, Warren, Arkansas
 Cincinnati Steam Paper Mill
 Congoleum Corp., Construction Paper Mill, Finksburg, Maryland
 Cottrell Paper Co Inc., Rock City Falls Paper Mill, Rock City Falls, New York
 Crane & Co., Dalton, Massachusetts (Main supplier of paper for the U.S. dollar)
 Curtis Paper Mill, Newark, Delaware (Closed paper mill also known as the Nonantum Mill)
 Domtar
 Ashdown Paper Mill, Ashdown, Arkansas
 Hawesville Paper Mill, Hawesville, Kentucky
 Johnsonburg Paper Mill, Johnsonburg, Pennsylvania
 Kingsport Paper Mill, Kingsport, Tennessee
 Marlboro Paper Mill, Bennettsville, South Carolina
 Nekoosa Paper Mill, Nekoosa, Wisconsin
 Plymouth Paper Mill, Plymouth, North Carolina
 Port Huron Paper Mill, Port Huron, Michigan
 Rothschild Paper Mill, Rothschild, Wisconsin
 French Paper Company, Niles, Michigan
 Georgia-Pacific 
 Camas Paper Mill, Camas, Washington
 Crossett Paper Mill, Crossett, Arkansas
 Palatka Paper Mill, Palatka, Florida
 Toledo Mill, Toledo, Oregon
 Glatfelter, Charlotte, North Carolina
 Graham Paper Company
Cupples Station Paper Mill, St. Louis, Missouri (opened in 1900)
North Broadway Paper Mill, St. Louis, Missouri (opened in 1957)
 Great Northern Paper Company, East Millinocket, Maine (closed 2011)
 Green Bay Packaging, Green Bay, Wisconsin
Green Bay Packaging, Morrilton, Arkansas
 Hollingsworth & Vose, Walpole, Massachusetts
 International Paper, Memphis, Tennessee
Albany Paper Mill, Albany, Oregon (Closed in 2009, demolished in 2012)
 Augusta Paper Mill, Augusta, Georgia
 Bogalusa Paper Mill, Bogalusa, Louisiana
 Cedar Rapids Paper Mill, Cedar Rapids, Iowa
Courtland Paper Mill, Courtland, Alabama (Closing completely in 2014)
Franklin Paper Mill, Franklin, Virginia (Closed in 2009 but recommissioned in 2012)
Georgetown Paper Mill, Georgetown, South Carolina
Henderson Paper Mill, Henderson, Kentucky
Louisiana Paper Mill, Bastrop, Louisiana (Closed in 2008)
Mansfield Paper Mill, Mansfield, Louisiana
Pensacola Paper Mill, Cantonment, Florida
Pine Hill Paper Mill, Pine Hill, Alabama
Pineville Paper Mill, Pineville, Louisiana (Closed in 2009)
Prattville Paper Mill, Prattville, Alabama
Red River Paper Mill, Campti, Louisiana
Riegelwood Paper Mill, Riegelwood, North Carolina
Riverdale Paper Mill, Selma, Alabama
 Rome Paper Mill, Rome, Georgia
 Savannah Paper Mill, Savannah, Georgia
Texarkana Paper Mill, Texarkana, Texas
Valliant Paper Mill, Valliant, Oklahoma
Vicksburg Paper Mill, Redwood, Mississippi
 Kalamazoo Vegetable Parchment Company (2 Mills), Parchment, Michigan (Closed paper mill operated by Crown Vantage prior to closure.)
 Kapstone, Northbrook, Illinois
 Charleston Kraft Paper Mill, North Charleston, South Carolina
 Cowpens Recycled Paper Mill, Cowpens, South Carolina
 Longview Kraft Paper Mill, Longview, Washington
 Roanoke Rapids Kraft Paper Mill, Roanoke Rapids, North Carolina
 Kimberly-Clark, Irving, Texas
 Lincoln Paper and Tissue, Lincoln, Maine (closed in 2013 tissue part recommissioned in 2014 paper part still closed)(Filed for Chapter 11 bankruptcy September 28, 2015)(Closed December 2015) 
 ND Paper
 Biron Paper Mill, Biron, Wisconsin
 Rumford Paper Mill, Rumford, Maine
Monadnock Paper Mills, Benington, New Hampshire 
 Packaging Corporation of America
 Counce Paper Mill, Counce, Tennessee
 DeRidder Paper Mill, DeRidder, Louisiana
 Filer City Paper Mill, Filer City, Michigan
 International Falls Paper Mill, International Falls, Minnesota
 Jackson Paper Mill, Jackson, Alabama
 St. Helens Paper Mill, St. Helens, Oregon
 Tomahawk Paper Mill, Tomahawk, Wisconsin
 Valdosta Paper Mill, Valdosta, Georgia
 Wallula Paper Mill, Wallula, Washington
 Parsons Paper Company, Holyoke, Massachusetts (closed 2005)
 Pixelle Specialty Solutions (formerly Glatfelter Specialty Papers)
 Androscoggin Paper Mill, Jay, Maine
 Chillicothe Paper Mill, Chillicothe, Ohio
 Fremont Paper Mill, Fremont, Ohio
 Spring Grove Paper Mill, Spring Grove, Pennsylvania
 Stevens Point Paper Mill, Stevens Points, Wisconsin
Port Townsend Paper Company Port Townsend, Washington
Resolute Forest Products, Augusta, Georgia
Calhoun Mill, Calhoun, Tennessee
Coosa Pines Mill, Childersburg, Alabama
Grenada Paper Mill, Grenada, Mississippi
Hialeah Tissue Mill, Hialeah, Florida
Menominee Mill, Menominee, Michigan
Sanford Tissue Mill, Sanford, Florida
 Resolute Forest Products, Catawba, South Carolina
Sappi
 S. D. Warren Paper Mill, Westbrook, Maine
 Somerset Paper Mill, Skowhegan, Maine
 Cloquet Paper Mill, Cloquet, Minnesota
 Scott Paper Company, Philadelphia, Pennsylvania (defunct)
Sylvamo
 Ticonderoga Mill, Ticonderoga, New York
 Eastover Mill, Eastover, South Carolina
 Twin Rivers Paper Company, Madawaska, Maine
 HQ & Maine Paper Operation, Madawaska, Maine
 New York Paper Operations
 Arkansas Operations Pulp Operation
 Lumber Operation, Plaster Rock, NB
UP Paper, Manistique, Michigan
 Verso Corporation, Memphis, Tennessee
 Duluth Paper Mill, Duluth, Minnesota; acquired in NewPage merger January 2015
 Escanaba Paper Mill, Escanaba, Michigan; acquired in NewPage merger January 2015
 Luke Paper Mill, Luke, Maryland; acquired in NewPage merger January 2015, closed in May 2019
 Quinnesec Mill, Quinnesec, Michigan
 Wisconsin Rapids Paper Mill, Wisconsin Rapids, Wisconsin; acquired in NewPage merger January 2015
 Weyerhaeuser, Federal Way, Washington
 Wausau Paper
 Missota Mill, Brainerd, Minnesota (closed)
 Brokaw Paper Mill, Brokaw, Wisconsin (closed)
 Harrodsburg Paper Mill, Harrodsburg, Kentucky
 Middletown Paper Mill, Middletown, Ohio
 WestRock, Demopolis Paper Mill, Demopolis, Alabama

Uruguay
 UPM-Kymmene Corporation, Fray Bentos Pulp Mill, Fray Bentos

Vietnam
Bãi Bằng, northwest of Hanoi

References

Paper mills